Edwin Robert Courtney Brinkworth (28 September 1901 – 1978) was an historian of central England and historical writer who produced three books on the history of Banbury, Oxfordshire.

Early life
Brinkworth was born in Bath, Somerset, on 28 September 1901 to Edwin James Brinkworth and his wife Alice Maude Brinkworth, both school teachers. He had a younger brother, Leonard George Brinkworth.

Career
Brinkworth's first historical work was the edited version of the Episcopal visitation book for the Archdeaconry of Buckingham, 1662, produced in association with the Buckinghamshire Record Society in 1947. In 1958 he produced Old Banbury: A Short Popular History which was published by the Banbury Historical Society.

Death
Brinkworth died in Banbury in 1978.

Selected publications
 Episcopal visitation book for the Archdeaconry of Buckingham, 1662. Buckinghamshire Record Society, Buckingham, 1947. (Editor)
 Old Banbury: A Short Popular History. Banbury Historical Society, 1958.
 Shakespeare and the Bawdy Court of Stratford. Phillimore, London, 1972. 
 New Light on the Life of Shakespeare. Oxford, 1975.
 Banbury Wills and Inventories Part Two 1621-1650. Banbury Historical Society, Banbury, 1976. (Edited with J.S.W. Gibson) 
 Banbury Corporation Records: Tudor and Stuart/Calendared, Abstracted and Edited & c. Banbury Historical Society, Banbury, 1977. (Edited with J.S.W. Gibson)

References

External links 
http://theshakespeareblog.com/2013/02/shakespeares-coriolanus-and-the-bawdy-court-of-stratford/

1901 births
1978 deaths
People from Bath, Somerset
Historians of Oxfordshire
Historians of England